Noriega Hotel, formerly known as Iberia Hotel, and commonly known as Noreiga's, was a Basque and American restaurant, boarding house and Basque cultural center located in East Bakersfield, California.  The business opened in 1893 and was a staple of the Basque American culture in Bakersfield and California at large for generations, but was forced to close in 2020 due to the COVID-19 pandemic.  The restaurant itself was later sold in June 2020 and moved to another location in Bakersfield, reopening in June 2021. The new iteration of the Noriega Hotel continues with the same recipes, as well as tables, chairs, plates and other memorabilia. However the original bar and neon sign were moved to the Kern County Museum.

History
Faustino Noriega immigrated to the United States from Santander, Spain in 1872 as a sheepherder.  In 1893, he partnered with Fernando Etchevarry, a Basque immigrant, to open the "Iberia Hotel".

The building served as a boardinghouse, post office, employment center, restaurant, and community center for Basques who often only spoke the Basque language.  Noriega's is located two blocks from the former Southern Pacific Station, where many immigrants had arrived from Ellis Island only with a lapel that said "Noriega Hotel Bakersfield, California".

In 1906, the name changed from Iberia Hotel to Noriega Hotel.

In 1931, Jean and Grace Elizalde bought the property.

In 1940, the current restaurant and portion of the building was added, and was opened to the public.

In March 2020, the restaurant temporarily closed due to the difficulty of social distancing with family style dining.  In April 2020, the restaurant announced they would not reopen and the restaurant was sold in June 2020.  At the time of the sale, the restaurants was co-owned by the two granddaughters of the Elizaldes, Linda Elizalde-McCoy and Rochelle Ladd. Mrs. Ladd, a longtime fixture at the restaurant and regular hostess, passed away in January 2023 at the age of 70 of a longstanding heart condition.

Noriega's has been featured in Huell Hower's television show, California's Gold, the LA Times, and Smithsonian Magazine.

The future of the building is unknown, but a new Noriega's opened in another part of Bakersfield in June 2021.

Cuisine
The restaurant serves a mixture of traditional Basque cuisine and more modern American cuisine.  Food is served family style at set times, 7am for breakfast, noon for lunch and 7pm for dinner.  The front of the restaurant contains a bar, open until about 10pm.  Meals are served in the dining room in the back.

Awards and accolades
In 2011, the restaurant received the James Beard Award for America's Classics.  This award is given to "given to restaurants with timeless appeal, beloved for quality food that reflects the character of their community"

External links 
 
 http://oldtownkern.com/places/businesses/hotels/noriega-hotel/
 https://www.visitbakersfield.com/directory/noriega-hotel-restaurant/

References 

Restaurants in California
Defunct restaurants in California
Bakersfield, California
Companies based in Kern County, California
Basque-American culture in California
Tourist attractions in California
Restaurants established in 1940
1940 establishments in California
James Beard Foundation Award winners